Tilman Riemenschneider ( 1460 – 7 July 1531) was a German sculptor and woodcarver active in Würzburg from 1483. He was one of the most prolific and versatile sculptors of the transition period between late Gothic and Renaissance, a master in stone and limewood.

Biography

 

Tilman Riemenschneider was born around the year 1460 at Heiligenstadt im Eichsfeld in present-day Thuringia.

They resettled in Osterode, where his father became Master of the Mint (a good position at that time) and where Riemenschneider spent his childhood years.

Riemenschneider likely came to Würzburg for the first time at the age of 18 in 1478/79. His uncle served as notary and financial advisor to the bishop there, but he did not stay for long. Around 1473, Riemenschneider learned the trade of sculpting and woodcarving, likely in Swabia or the Upper Rhine — possibly in Strasbourg and/or Ulm. At that time, the statutes of the guild of sculptors required that an apprentice travel to many different workshops to gain experience. Very little is known about this period of his life, but he likely came in contact with the work of Martin Schongauer, whose copper engravings served him later as examples.

In 1483, he settled in Würzburg. On 7 December 1483, he joined the Saint Luke's Guild of painters, sculptors, and glass workers as a painter's assistant. On 28 February 1485, he married Anna Schmidt (born Uchenhofer), a widow of a master goldsmith with three sons. This marriage not only brought him property, but it also meant that he could end his apprenticeship and become a master craftsman.

Also in 1485, Riemenschneider became a citizen of Würzburg, which made it possible to attain the status of master craftsman, and opened a workshop in Franziskanergasse, in the home of his wife.

His earliest confirmed work is the gravestone of Eberhard von Grumbach in the Pfarrkirche at Rimpar. This may be the type of work he started out with before obtaining large church commissions. He started to receive numerous orders from the town councils of Würzburg and neighboring towns. The earliest large work attributed to him is the Franziskusaltar in the St Jakobskirche in Rothenburg ob der Tauber, which is described in the church guide book as 'about 1490', but its style compared to other works of that date is rather primitive, suggesting it may be an earlier work, sometimes dated from 1485. In 1490, the town council of Münnerstadt ordered an altarpiece for the altar of St Maria Magdalena, the parish church, which included a carving of Mary Magdalene with six angels. It was set up in 1492. In 1491, the town council of Würzburg ordered two life-sized stone figures of Adam and Eve for the south portal of the council's church, the Marienkapelle (erected in 1493).

In 1494, Riemenschneider's first wife died, leaving him with three stepsons and a daughter. In keeping with the times and his status, he remarried in 1497, Anna Rappolt. She bore him two daughters and three sons, all of whom seem to have inherited their father's artistic talent. In 1495, he created the statue of Mary with child (Pfarrkirche St Bernard in Würzburg).

More high-profile work followed: In 1496 Riemenschneider received the order to carve the tomb of Prince-Bishop Rudolf von Scherenberg at Würzburg Cathedral. It was delivered in 1499, the same year in which an order arrived for the Imperial tomb at Bamberg Cathedral (delivered 1513).

By 1500, he had developed an outstanding reputation as an artist and had become a wealthy Würzburg citizen. Not only did he own a number of houses, but he also was a landowner with his own vineyards. His flourishing workshop provided work for as many as 40 apprentices doing woodcarving, sculpting, and painting.

In November 1504, Riemenschneider became a member of the Unterrat (councilman) of the town of Würzburg, an office he held until 1525. This office not only brought him social status, but it also helped him obtain many large and profitable orders.

In 1508, Riemenschneider married Margaretha Wurzbach. From 1509 until 1522 he was a member of the Oberrat four times. He married again, in 1520, a woman of whom only the first name, Margarethe, is known. In 1520/1, Riemenschneider was a mayor of Würzburg (in the Middle Ages there were always two people who held this position at the same time).

His increasing engagement in local politics at a time of heavy order volume meant that his apprentices took a more prominent role in the creation of the workshop's output. Art historians have been able to identify specific figures as the work of individual workers.

During the German Peasants' War, Riemenschneider was one of the town council members who refused to obey an order by Konrad von Thüngen, the Prince-Bishop of Würzburg to fight the revolting peasants. On 4 June 1525, the peasant's army was destroyed, with 8,000 killed, just outside Würzburg by the troops of Georg, Steward of Waldburg-Zeil, and the bishop. After the town surrendered, the full town council, including Riemenschneider, was incarcerated and tortured in Marienberg Fortress. The claim that both of his hands were broken during the torture, which ended his artistic career, is today considered to be a legend without base in fact. It probably only originated in the 19th century after his "rediscovery". Together with the rest of the council, Tilman was set free after two months, with loss of most of his property. The only order he is known to have received after this was work in 1527 for a Benedictine nunnery at Kitzingen. Until his death on 7 July 1531 at Würzburg, he led a retired life with his fourth wife. His son Jörg from his second marriage continued the workshop after his death.

Due to his loss of status, Riemenschneider was soon forgotten as an artist, other than for the two gravestones of Bishops Rudolf von Scherenberg and Lorenz von Bibra side by side at the Würzburg Cathedral. Only when his gravestone was discovered in 1822 between Würzburg Cathedral and Neumünster was his outstanding position in Gothic sculpture recognized by a wider audience. Unlike Albrecht Dürer or Veit Stoss, Riemenschneider acquired true fame only posthumously.

Art 

The sculptures and woodcarvings of Tilman Riemenschneider are in the late Gothic style, although his later work show mannerist characteristics. Notably the tomb for Lorenz von Bibra (see below) is considered as one of the pieces marking the transition from Gothic to Renaissance art. His work is characterized by the expressiveness of the figurines' faces (often shown with an inward look, as in the 'self-portrait') and by their detailed and richly folded clothing. The emphasis on expression of inner emotions sets Riemenschneider's work apart from that of his immediate predecessors.

Riemenschneider's early success as a sculptor was due to the plasticity of his works, with great care being taken of modeling the folds of garments. This way of sculpting the garments as well as the typical oval faces and almond-shaped eyes were modelled on art from the Upper Rhine region of the 1470s, implying that Riemenschneider may have learned his trade either there or at Ulm. Later works lost some of the volume of the early sculptures, allowing a more efficient production.

Riemenschneider is seen today as one of the first sculptors of the 15th century who did not have all his figures painted. Prior to the 1490s, almost every sculpture had been painted in several layers by a different artist, who often attracted more admiration than the sculptor. The reasons for shifting to a new type of art, where the wood was visible, are still debated by art historians.

Riemenschneider worked in both wood and stone. It is assumed he learned stone carving first and only later turned to wood carving. Some wooden figures, though unmistakably his own work, show some signs of less-than-perfect choice of wood or handling.

Souren Melikian places Riemenschneider's best work, such as the Virgin listening to the Annunciation, in the same league as the oil paintings of Albrecht Dürer. Art historian Kenneth Clark views the Riemenschneider figures as showing the serious personal piety in Germany in the late fifteenth century and as harbingers of the coming Reformation.

Major works 

The largest collection of his work, 81 pieces, can be found in the Mainfränkisches Museum in the Fortress Marienberg in Würzburg.
 Altar of the Farewell of the Apostles, Allerheiligenkirche,  near Nuremberg, 1491
 Altar Piece, Maria Magdalena, Münnerstadt, 1490/1492
 Adam and Eve, originally Marienkapelle Würzburg, Mainfränkisches Museum, 1491/1493
 Sculpture of Bishop Rudolf von Scherenberg, Würzburg Cathedral, 1496/1499
 Emperor's Tomb, Bamberg Cathedral, 1499/1513
 Mary Salome and Zebedee, Würzburg 1501-5, now in the Victoria and Albert Museum, London
 Saint Anne and her three husbands, Munich, Bayerisches Nationalmuseum, 1505/1510, wood
 Grieving Maria, Würzburg, Mainfränkisches Museum, around 1505
 Altar of Maria, Creglingen, around 1505/1508, wood
 Altar of the Apostles, Altar of the Church Fathers, and Altar of the Annunciation, Carving of St. Kilian, Crucifix, epitaph of Hans von Bibra, St. Leo church, Bibra near Meiningen, around 1500, wood except epitaph
 Crucifixion, St. Nikolas Church in Eisingen, Bavaria, 1500—1505
 Holy Blood Altar, Jakobskirche, Rothenburg ob der Tauber, 1501—1505, wood
 Altar of the Apostles, St.-Kilians-Kirche zu Windsheim, 1509, now in the Kurpfälzisches Museum, Heidelberg
 Crucifixion Altar, church of Detwang (Rothenburg ob der Tauber), 1510/1513, now in the Kurpfälzisches Museum, Heidelberg
 Tomb of Bishop Lorenz of Bibra, Würzburg Cathedral, 1520/1522
 The Lamentation of Christ, abbey church of Maidbronn near Würzburg, 1525
 The Assumption of the Virgin, center panel of the Creglingen altarpiece, Herrgottskirche, Creglingen, 1495–1499

In literature
The character Goldmund in the 1930 book Narcissus and Goldmund by Hermann Hesse serves as an apprentice with a master sculptor who is socially prominent in the town where he worked and whose character appears to be loosely based on that of Riemenschneider. He serves both as an artistic inspiration for Goldmund and as a foil for the less restrained temperament of Goldmund.

Hesse describes Riemenschneider's  statue of Mary with child which resides in the Pfarrkirche St Bernard in Würzburg as:

"Dreamily she gazes out from her glass case, far away from our world... in her gracefulness and distinction she is refined to a degree of perfection far above that of mankind today."

The plot of Elizabeth Peters's first Vicky Bliss mystery novel, "Borrower of the Night" (1973)  centers around the search for a missing  Riemenschneider sculpture.  Most of the action takes place in Rothenburg ob der Tauber.

References

 The Limewood Sculptors of Renaissance Germany, Michael Baxandall, 1980
 Tilman Riemenschneider: Master Sculptor of the Late Middle Ages, Julien Chapuis et al., 1999
 "Tilman Riemenschneider",  The Catholic Encyclopedia
 Riemenschneider im Taubertal, Kurt Gerstenberg, 1939.
 Vincent Mayr, "Riemenschneider, Tilman" Grove Art Online. Oxford University Press,(6-21-2006)
 Julien Chapuis, Tilman Riemenschneider: Master Sculptor of the Late Middle Ages, National Gallery London Publications, 11 October 1999,     

External links

 Mainfränkisches Museum, Würzburg
  National Gallery of Art exhibit: Tilman Riemenschneider: Master Sculptor of the Late Middle Ages
  Virgin and Child at the Spencer Museum of Art, University of Kansas, Lawrence, Kansas
Art of Germany (BBC documentary, 2010). In Episode one Andrew Graham-Dixon visits and comments on the Holy Blood Altar.'' 
 

German woodcarvers
Medieval German artists
Medieval German sculptors
German Renaissance sculptors
1460s births
1531 deaths

Wooden sculptures in Germany
Painters from Würzburg
People from Heilbad Heiligenstadt
Burials at Würzburg Cathedral
German male sculptors
15th-century German sculptors
16th-century German sculptors
15th-century German artists
16th-century German artists
German Roman Catholics